Hot Water may refer to:

Hot Water (novel), a 1932 novel by P.G. Wodehouse
Hot Water (album), an album by Jimmy Buffett
"Hot Water" (song), a 1984 song by Level 42
Hot Water (1924 film), feature film starring silent comedian Harold Lloyd
Hot Water (1937 film), 55-min American comedy directed by Frank R. Strayer
Hot Water, a 1978 film directed by Su Friedrich
"Hot Water" (American Dad!), a 2011 episode of American Dad!